Felzins is a commune in the Lot department in south-western France. The name Felzins comes from the Latin Felzino, Felzinio, Filiciniaco.

See also
Communes of the Lot department

References

Communes of Lot (department)